Punjai Pugalur is a Municipality in Karur district in the Indian state of Tamil Nadu.

Demographics
At the 2001 India census, Punjai Pugalur had a population of 20,306 (males 50%, females 50%). Punjaipugalur had an average literacy rate of 69%, higher than the national average of 59.5%. Male literacy was 78%, and female literacy 61%. 10% of the population was under 6 years of age.

References

Cities and towns in Karur district